Alilu Ahmadsargurab District (Alilu /72928473) is a district (bakhsh) in Shaft County, Gilan Province, Iran. At the 2006 census, its population was 28,056, in 7,273 families.  The District has one city: Ahmadsargurab. The District has two rural districts (dehestan): Ahmadsargurab Rural District and Chubar Rural District.

References 

Shaft County
Districts of Gilan Province